The Women's scratch race at the 2014 Commonwealth Games, as part of the cycling programme, took place on 26 July 2014. Australian Annette Edmondson and Amy Cure came first respectively second – with Elinor Barker from Wales finishing third. The event was held at Sir Chris Hoy Velodrome in Glasgow, Scotland. A total of 24 competitors, including one not starting and three not finishing, from 11 nations took part of the race.

Results

References

Women's scratch race
Cycling at the Commonwealth Games – Women's scratch
Comm